Methodist Episcopal Church, South (Old Daphne Methodist Church) is a historic church at 1608 Old County Road in Daphne, Alabama.  It was built in 1858 in a Greek Revival style. The building was added to the National Register of Historic Places in 1980.

References

Methodist churches in Alabama
Churches on the National Register of Historic Places in Alabama
National Register of Historic Places in Baldwin County, Alabama
Greek Revival church buildings in Alabama
Churches completed in 1858
Churches in Baldwin County, Alabama